Albin Lundin (born March 15, 1996) is a Swedish professional ice hockey player. He is currently playing with Timrå IK of the Swedish Hockey League (SHL).

Lundin made his Swedish Hockey League debut playing with Djurgårdens IF Hockey during the 2014–15 SHL season. He has also played for Skellefteå AIK.

References

External links

1996 births
Living people
Almtuna IS players
Djurgårdens IF Hockey players
Skellefteå AIK players
Ice hockey people from Stockholm
Swedish ice hockey forwards
Timrå IK players